

List of Ambassadors

Eliav Belotsercovsky 2022 - 
Lior Keinan 2017 - 2018
Arthur Lenk 2013 - 2017
Dov Segev-Steinberg 2008 - 2013
Ilan Baruch (diplomat) 2005 - 2008
Tova Herzl 2001 - 2003
Uri Oren 1998 - 2001
David Ariel 1985 - 1989
Eliyahu Lankin 1981 to 1985,
Joseph Harmelin 1979 - 1981
Itzhak Unna 1974 - 1975
Chargé d'Affaires a.i. Mordechai Palzur
Minister Eliezer Yapou 1966 - 1969
Minister Simcha Pratt 1961 - 1963
Minister Katriel Salmon 1959 - 1961
Minister Itzhak Bavly 1955 - 1959
Minister Semah Cecil Hyman 1952 - 1955
Minister David Goitein 1950 - 1951

Consulate (Johannesburg)
Consul General Gershon Gera 1978
Consul General Matityahu Dagan 1975 - 1978
Consul General Jacob Doron 1959 - 1963
Consul General Gabriel Doron 1956 - 1959

References 

South Africa
Israel